Hugh Byrne may refer to:

Hugh Byrne (Fianna Fáil politician) (born 1943), Irish politician, Fianna Fáil TD and Senator
Hugh Byrne (Fine Gael politician) (born 1939), Irish politician, Fine Gael TD for Dublin North West from 1969 to 1982
Hugh Byrne (rugby league), Australian rugby league footballer who played in the 1920s and 1930s